The Battle of Bapaume was a battle during the Franco-Prussian War, brought about by French attempts to relieve the besieged city of Péronne, Somme. The battle was fought on 3 January 1871 near the town of Bapaume.

The Prussian 1st Army had reached Bapaume at the end of December while at the same time the French Army of the North under Faidherbe moved out to break the German siege of Péronne. Both sides encountered each other near Bapaume. Although Faidherbe's green troops held their own against the outnumbered but experienced Prussians, they did not follow up their advantage. As a consequence, Péronne surrendered on 10 January. Soon the Prussians would be reinforced and two weeks later they would meet Faidherbe in battle again at Saint Quentin.

References

Bapaume 1871
Bapaume 1871
Bapaume 1871
1871 in France
January 1871 events